1227 Geranium, provisional designation , is a carbonaceous background asteroid from the outer regions of the asteroid belt, approximately 46 kilometers in diameter. It was discovered on 5 October 1931, by German astronomer Karl Reinmuth at the Heidelberg-Königstuhl State Observatory. The asteroid was named for the flowering plant Geranium (cranesbills).

Orbit and classification 

Geranium is a non-family asteroid from the main belt's background population. It orbits the Sun in the outer main-belt at a distance of 2.6–3.8 AU once every 5 years and 9 months (2,109 days; semi-major axis 3.22 AU). Its orbit has an eccentricity of 0.19 and an inclination of 16° with respect to the ecliptic.

The body's observation arc begins at Uccle Observatory, four days after its official discovery observation at Heidelberg.

Physical characteristics 

Geranium has been characterized as a carbonaceous C-type asteroid by SDSS–MFB (Masi Foglia Bus).

Rotation period 

In April 2010, a rotational lightcurve of Geranium was obtained from photometric observations by astronomers at the Oakley Southern Sky Observatory in Australia. Lightcurve analysis gave a well-defined rotation period of 12.363 hours with a brightness amplitude of 0.08 magnitude, indicative for a rather spherical shape.

Diameter and albedo 

According to the surveys carried out by the Japanese Akari satellite and the NEOWISE mission of NASA's Wide-field Infrared Survey Explorer, Geranium measures between 46.08 and 51.025 kilometers in diameter and its surface has an albedo between 0.0619 and 0.076.

The Collaborative Asteroid Lightcurve Link derives an albedo of 0.0492 and a diameter of 41.46 kilometers based on an absolute magnitude of 10.8.

Naming 

This minor planet was named after Geranium, a genus of flowering plants commonly known as "cranesbills". The official naming citation was mentioned in The Names of the Minor Planets by Paul Herget in 1955.

Meta-naming 

The initials of the minor planets  through , all discovered by Reinmuth, spell out "G. Stracke". Gustav Stracke was a German astronomer and orbit computer, who had asked that no planet be named after him. In this manner Reinmuth was able to honour the man whilst honoring his wish. Nevertheless, Reinmuth directly honored Stracke by naming planet  later on. The astronomer Brian Marsden was honored by the same type of meta-naming using consecutive initial letters in 1995, spelling out "Brian M." in the sequence of minor planets  through .

Reinmuth's flowers 

Due to his many discoveries, Karl Reinmuth submitted a large list of 66 newly named asteroids in the early 1930s. This list also contained a sequence of 28 asteroids, starting with 1054 Forsytia, that were all named after plants, in particular flowering plants (also see list of minor planets named after animals and plants).

References

External links 
 Asteroid Lightcurve Database (LCDB), query form (info )
 Dictionary of Minor Planet Names, Google books
 Asteroids and comets rotation curves, CdR – Observatoire de Genève, Raoul Behrend
 Discovery Circumstances: Numbered Minor Planets (1)-(5000) – Minor Planet Center
 
 

001227
Discoveries by Karl Wilhelm Reinmuth
Named minor planets
19311005